Byen may refer to:

Byen (album), studio album by Norwegian musician Bjørn Torske
DR Byen, literally The DR City, headquarters of the Danish Broadcasting Corporation, DR, located in Copenhagen, Denmark
DR Byen Station, rapid transit station on the Copenhagen Metro
DGI-byen, facility that houses various spa facilities, restaurants, hotels, conference facilities, a bowling alley, flexible multi-centres, sports clubs, pool in central Copenhagen, Denmark
FN Byen, also known as UN City, two campuses that combined house 11 United Nations agencies in Copenhagen
TV-Byen, former headquarters of the Danish broadcaster DR, located in Gladsaxe, northwest of central Copenhagen, Denmark

See also
Under Byen, Danish band